Randy Howard Katz is a distinguished professor at University of California, Berkeley of the electrical engineering and computer science department.

Biography
Katz was born in Brooklyn, New York in 1955. He was first exposed to computers in Canarsie High School's well equipped laboratory. After graduating in 1973, Katz received an A.B. from Cornell University (May 1976), where he was a Cornell College Scholar majoring in Computer Science and Mathematics, an M.S. from UC Berkeley (June 1978), under the direction of Larry Rowe, and a Ph.D., from UC Berkeley (June 1980), under the direction of Eugene Wong. He was a member of the Ingres Project.

After working at BBN and CCA in Cambridge, Massachusetts, Katz was an assistant professor in the Computer Sciences Department at the University of Wisconsin-Madison from 1981 to 1983. In 1983, he joined the Electrical Engineering and Computer Science Department at the University of California, Berkeley. He was promoted to associate professor in 1985 and full professor in 1988. He was appointed the United Microelectronics Corporation Distinguished Professor in EECS in 1996. From 1996 to 1999, he served as chair of the EECS Department, the first computer scientist to do so. In 2015, he served as chair of the Department's Computer Science Division. In 2018, he was appointed Berkeley's vice chancellor for research. He retired from the university in December 2021.

Katz is a fellow of the Association for Computing Machinery (ACM), Institute of Electrical and Electronics Engineers (IEEE), the American Academy of Arts and Sciences (AAAS), and the American Association for the Advancement of Science (AAAS). He is also a member of the National Academy of Engineering (2000) for "contributions to high-performance input/output systems, engineering education, and government service".

He has published over 350 refereed technical papers, book chapters, and books. His textbook, Contemporary Logic Design, has sold over 85,000 copies, and has been used at over 200 colleges and universities. His academic recognitions include the Computer Science Division's Diane S. McEntyre Award for Excellence in Teaching Award, the Jim and Donna Gray Faculty Award for Excellence in Undergraduate Teaching, the Berkeley Academic Senate Distinguished Teaching Award, the ASEE Frederic E. Terman Award, the IEEE James H. Mulligan Jr. Education Medal, the ACM Karl V. Karlstrom Outstanding Educator Award, the ACM Sigmobile Outstanding Contributor Award, the IEEE Reynolds Johnson Information Storage Award, the Outstanding Alumni Award of the Computer Science Division, the CRA Distinguished Service Award, the United States Department of the Air Force Decoration for Exceptional Civilian Service, and the Pingat Bakti Masyarakat of the Government of Singapore. 

Katz, along with David A. Patterson and Garth Gibson, developed the redundant array of inexpensive disks (RAID) concept for computer storage in their 1988 SIGMOD Conference paper. He also led the effort to connect the White House to the Internet in 1994.

Books

Award Publications

References

External links
 UC Berkeley webpage

Cornell University alumni
University of California, Berkeley alumni
Fellows of the Association for Computing Machinery
Living people
Members of the United States National Academy of Engineering
UC Berkeley College of Engineering faculty
Fellow Members of the IEEE
Fellows of the American Academy of Arts and Sciences
Year of birth missing (living people)